The Balochistan (or Baluchistan) black bear (Ursus thibetanus gedrosianus) is a subspecies of the Asian black bear occurring in the Balochistan Mountains of southern Pakistan and Iran. It has an unusually thin coat for an Asian black bear, but this is because it is found in a warmer climate than most of the other subspecies, which are found in the much colder Himalayan Mountains. It is also more frugivorous than the other subspecies, and it loves to eat figs and bananas.

Characteristics
The Balochistan black bear has short, coarse fur ranging in colour from black to reddish brown. It is smaller than the other subspecies with a head and body length of  including tail.

Distribution and habitat
The Balochistan black bear inhabits the hilly areas of the Balochistan province in southwest Pakistan. It has been recorded in the Sulaiman Mountains, Khuzdar District and Kharan District.

Behaviour and ecology
This species is omnivorous, as it eats fruits, insects, and small reptiles. It is also known for breaking logs in the hunt of grubs. Though they are omnivorous, their preferred diet is fruits, especially Indian olives and Ber.

Threats

Balochistan black bears are captured by locals who try to raise them as pets for circuses and bear-baiting. In bear baiting, claws and canines of each bear are extracted and they are left to fight dogs. This practice was made unlawful and prohibited in 2001 but still occurs illegally to some extent.
Habitat loss is a major threat to this species because of illegal logging, the growth of human population that leads to expansion of villages, development of highways network, and installation of power stations in the wild.

It is now considered extinct in most of the area. Deforestation and loss of habitat is the greatest problem it faces.
Local and nomad herders let their cattle graze in the bear territory and end up in killing the native bears, blaming them for the killing of their livestock. Poaching for body parts like gall bladders for medicines is also a threat to the species.

Conservation
In Pakistan, the Balochistan black bear is considered Critically Endangered.

References

Bears
Natural history of Balochistan, Pakistan
Mammals of Pakistan